New wave reggae may refer to:

2 Tone
New wave